Peyton Alex Smith (born June 18, 1994) is an American actor, best known for his role as Damon Sims in the TV series All American: Homecoming as well as Rafael Waithe in the CW series Legacies and  Cedric Hobbs in the TV series The Quad.

Smith attended Florida A&M University

Filmography

Film

Television

References

External links

1994 births
Living people
American male film actors
American male television actors
21st-century American male actors
Florida A&M University alumni
Male actors from Dallas
Rappers from Dallas
21st-century American rappers